Nkululeko Habedi (17 October 1977 – 9 March 2015), professionally known as Flabba, was a South African hip-hop musician. He was a member of the South African hip-hop collective Skwatta Kamp.

Early life and career 
He was born in Orlando West in Soweto. He later moved to live in Alexandra with his parents. He was part of the seven piece rap group Skwatta Kamp, a name derived from Squatter Camp, due to South Africa's Shanty Towns (members: Infa, Nish, Shugasmakx, Flabba, Nemza, Slikour, Bozza) which released four albums between the years 2002 and 2009. "Khut and Joyn" was released in 2002 followed by "Mkhukhu Funkshen" in 2003 and "Washumkhukhu" in 2004 after which the group took a break from the music industry to focus on their solo careers and returned in 2009 for their last album "Fair and Skwear". During the gap between the third and fourth album Flabba released his solo album "Nkuli vs. Flabba" which won an award for "Best Rap Album"  in 2007 at the 13th annual South African Music Awards.  Rumors of his solo sophomore album, The F Word surfaced in early 2011, but was never released.

Death 
He died in the early hours of 9 March 2015, due to a fatal stab wound at his home in Alexandra, after an altercation with his girlfriend, Sindisiwe Manqele.  He was 37.

See also
 List of murdered hip hop musicians

References

1977 births
2015 deaths
People from Soweto
South African rappers
Deaths by stabbing in South Africa